Mason Marchment (born June 18, 1995) is a Canadian professional ice hockey forward for the Dallas Stars of the National Hockey League (NHL).

Playing career
Despite not playing major junior hockey until the age of 19, Marchment was signed by the Maple Leafs to an American Hockey League contract in 2016. On March 17, 2018, Marchment signed a two-year entry level contract with the Maple Leafs.

During the 2019–20 season, on January 1, 2020, after losing several forwards to injury, the Maple Leafs called up Marchment to make his NHL debut the following night against the Winnipeg Jets. He registered one assist in four appearances with the Maple Leafs, across multiple callups before he was traded by Toronto to the Florida Panthers in exchange for Denis Malgin on February 19, 2020.

On November 3, 2020, Marchment as a restricted free agent was re-signed by the Panthers to a one-year, two-way contract. On April 5, 2021, he was signed to a one-year contract extension by the Panthers. On January 31, 2022, Marchment recorded a six-point (two goals and four assists) game, tying Olli Jokinen's franchise record for most points in a game, in the Panthers' 8–4 win over the Columbus Blue Jackets.

On February 18, 2022, Marchment scored his first career hat trick in a 6–2 Florida Panthers win over the Minnesota Wild.

As a free agent from the Panthers, Marchment was signed to a four-year, $18 million contract with the Dallas Stars on July 13, 2022.
In his first game with the Stars, Marchment recorded 2 goals to lead his team to a win over the Nashville Predators.

Personal life
Marchment is the son of longtime NHL defenceman Bryan Marchment and his wife, Kim. Marchment has one sister, Logan. Like Mason, Bryan also played for the Maple Leafs. His cousin, Kennedy Marchment, plays with the Connecticut Whale of the Premier Hockey Federation.

Career statistics

Awards and honors

References

External links
 

1995 births
Living people
Canadian ice hockey left wingers
Dallas Stars players
Erie Otters players
Florida Panthers players
Hamilton Bulldogs (OHL) players
Mississauga Steelheads players
Orlando Solar Bears (ECHL) players
People from Uxbridge, Ontario
Springfield Thunderbirds players
Toronto Maple Leafs players
Toronto Marlies players
Undrafted National Hockey League players